New York held its state presidential primary on February 5, 2008 (Super Tuesday). There were 101 delegates up for grabs for the candidates.  The delegates were awarded on a winner-take-all basis, which means the winner, Arizona Senator John McCain, received all 101 delegates for the 2008 Republican National Convention.

On February 2, McCain had held a fairly large lead in the polls above the competition with 35% as opposed to the next candidate Rudy Giuliani with 22.5%, who had announced a withdrawal from the race on January 30, 
2008.

Results

* Candidate dropped out of the race before the primary

See also
 2008 New York Democratic presidential primary
 2008 Republican Party presidential primaries

References

New York
2008
2008 New York (state) elections
2008 Super Tuesday